Friedrich August Moritz Retzsch (December 9, 1779 - June 11, 1857) was a German painter, draughtsman, and etcher.

Retzsch was born in the Saxon capital Dresden. He joined the Dresden Academy of Fine Arts in 1798 under Cajetan Toscani and Józef Grassi, later working autodidactically, copying the famous pictures of the Gemäldegalerie, among them a copy of the Sixtinian Madonna. He was made a member of the Academy in 1817 and professor in 1824. The Cotta publishing house commissioned illustrations for Johann Wolfgang Goethe's Faust (26 plates), which made him financially independent. Goethe liked his work, and he illustrated works by other famous authors, most notably Friedrich Schiller's Lied von der Glocke (43 plates), a Shakespeare Gallery (80 plates), and Bürger's Ballads (15 plates).  He also did oil paintings on classical subjects, and portraits. Many of his works were created in a house in the Lößnitz, with a view of the Elbe Valley.

As a winemaker, he was a member of the Saxon wine association from 1799 onwards. Retzsch died in Oberlössnitz/Radebeul.

Notes

References
Das Winzerfest der Weinbaugesellschaft im Königreich Sachsen am 25.10.1840, Meinhold & Söhne, Dresden 
Neidhardt, H.J., Die Malerei der Romantik in Dresden, Seemann Verlag. Leipzig, 1976
H. Heine, Die Harzreise, Ph. Reclam jun. Verlag Leipzig, 16th edn., 1961, p. 48
Bäumel, J., Vom landesherrlichen Bacchus-Triumph zum Aufzug der "Hofewintzer", in: 600 Jahre Hoflößnitz, historische Weingutsanlage, S.125-139, M. Sandstein Verl. Dresden, 2001; Vogel, G.H., Vivat Bacchus, Bacchus lebe ..., pp. 154–162.

External links
 
  An engraving of a painting by Retzsch made for The Literary Souvenir, 1825 with illustrative verse by Letitia Elizabeth Landon.

1779 births
1857 deaths
German draughtsmen
German engravers
18th-century German painters
18th-century German male artists
German male painters
19th-century German painters
19th-century German male artists
Academic staff of the Dresden Academy of Fine Arts
People from the Electorate of Saxony